Tommy Atterhäll (born 9 October 1978 in Gothenburg, Sweden) is a Swedish handball coach and former player.

References

Swedish male handball players
1978 births
Living people
Handball players from Gothenburg